Margarete Wolff was a German luger who competed in the late 1920s. She won a silver medal in the first-ever women's singles event at the 1928 European luge championships at Schreiberhau, Germany (now Szklarska Poręba, Poland).

References
List of European luge champions 

German female lugers
Year of birth missing
Year of death missing